Point Beach Nuclear Plant is a nuclear power plant located on Lake Michigan in the town of Two Creeks, Wisconsin, United States. The plant was built by Wisconsin Electric Power Company (now We Energies, a subsidiary of Wisconsin Energy Corporation), and previously operated by the Nuclear Management Company. The plant is currently owned and operated by NextEra Energy Resources (prior to 2009 – FPL Energy), of Juno Beach, Florida.

The plant is composed of two, two-loop Westinghouse pressurized water reactors. There is also a visitors' center located at the Point Beach plant.

Construction for Unit 1 began in 1966 and it was placed into commercial operation in December 1970. Unit 2 was placed into commercial operation in September 1972. The plant was built for a total cost of $114.9 million ($844 million, 2023 USD).

The entire site covers 1,050 acres; approximately 70 acres are used for plant and transmission yard infrastructure and the remaining land used for agriculture.

History 
The original letter of intent to purchase a single 454 megawatt (MW) nuclear unit from Westinghouse Electric Company for a fixed-price was issued by Wisconsin Electric and Wisconsin Michigan Power Company (a Wisconsin Electric subsidiary) on December 30, 1965. The right was reserved to order a second, duplicate unit under the same terms. In May, 1966, the announcement was made that the plant would be built on a 1,200-acre site in the town of Two Creeks.

On November 28, 1966, following Public Service Commission of Wisconsin (PSCW) endorsement and a brief public hearing, Alfred Gruhl, Glenn Reed, and Sol Burstein turned the first symbolic spades of dirt for the official ground-breaking. In May, 1967, the Atomic Energy Commission (AEC), predecessor to the Nuclear Regulatory Commission (NRC), issued the official construction permit (number 32) for Point Beach Unit 1. The Unit 2 construction permit (number 47) was issued approximately a year later.

On October 5, 1970, the AEC issued its full-term, full-power Operating License (DPR-24) for Point Beach Unit 1. The loading fuel into the reactor commenced almost immediately. On November 2, 1970, operators achieved initial criticality, with the nuclear-powered electricity being produced four days later, on November 6. Full commercial service was reached on December 21, 1970, just 49 months from the initial groundbreaking ceremony. After delays from nuclear power opponents, Unit 2 was granted a full-term, full-power operating license (DPR-27) on March 8, 1973, almost  years behind the original schedule.

Due to steam generator tube degradation and failures caused by intergranular stress corrosion cracking, Unit 1 was operated at approximately 75-80% of full power from December 1979 until October 1983, when replacement steam generators were installed.  The Unit 2 steam generators were replaced in 1996–1997.

In 2005, the NRC approved the initial license renewal application for the Point Beach plant, extending the operating license from forty years to sixty. in 2011, the NRC approved a 17% increase in power output (a.k.a. extended power uprate) from both units. This entailed significant upgrades to several plant systems and components, including safety-related pumps and valves, as well as the turbine-generator sets.

NextEra Energy Resources purchased the plant from Wisconsin Electric Power Company in October 2007. As part of the sale, We Energies agreed to repurchase all of the power produced by the plant for at least 20 years. In 2000–2007 the plant was managed by the Nuclear Management Company.

Owners submitted applications for subsequent license extension (60 years to 80 years) for both reactors to the NRC in November 2020. The decision announcement was expected in July 2022, however this was delayed as the NRC required additional environmental impact evaluation be completed. A NRC public meeting was held on February 17, 2021 to solicit public comments on the scope of the environmental review.

Most of the power from this plant goes to the Green Bay area and communities along the Lake Michigan shoreline of Southeastern Wisconsin. The plant is connected to the grid by four 345 kV lines, one of which travels northwest towards Green Bay and then on to the We Energies North Appleton substation located about 12 miles north of Appleton, Wisconsin, and the other one interconnecting with the now-closed Kewaunee Nuclear Generating Station located a short distance away to the north from Point Beach. The other 345 kV lines going out of the plant go south towards Milwaukee. Several 138 kV lines going out of the plant supply electricity to the surrounding area.

In November 2020, construction of the nearby 150 MW Two Creeks Solar Park was completed, at a cost of $195 Million. The solar farm is located several miles southwest of the nuclear plant.

Electricity Generation 
Point Beach generated 9,970 GWh in 2021, approximately 16% of the total electricity produced in Wisconsin.

Surrounding population 

The 2010 U.S. population within  of Point Beach was 19,975, a decrease of 6.7 percent in a decade, according to an analysis of U.S. Census data for msnbc.com. The 2010 U.S. population within  was 777,556, an increase of 10.0 percent since 2000. Cities within 50 miles include Green Bay (28 miles to city center).

Seismic risk
The Nuclear Regulatory Commission's estimate of the risk each year of an earthquake intense enough to cause core damage to the reactor at Point Beach was 1 in 90,909, according to an NRC study published in August 2010. This was tied for 62 in a list of 104 with #1 being most at risk.

References

External links

NukeWorker

Energy infrastructure completed in 1970
Energy infrastructure completed in 1972
Nuclear power plants in Wisconsin
Buildings and structures in Manitowoc County, Wisconsin
NextEra Energy
Nuclear power stations using pressurized water reactors